Sonia Gazi is a Bangladeshi model and beauty pageant titleholder who was crowned Miss Bangladesh 2000 and represented Bangladesh at Miss World 2000.

References

Bangladeshi beauty pageant winners
Bangladeshi female models
Living people
Miss World 2000 delegates
Year of birth missing (living people)